The rock pocket mouse (Chaetodipus intermedius) is one of 19 species of pocket mice in the genus Chaetodipus. It is sometimes grouped in the genus Perognathus.

Description
Found mainly in rocky outcrops in the deserts of the southwestern United States and Mexico, the rock pocket mouse is medium-sized (length ~18 cm, weight ~12–18g) and nocturnal. It eats mainly plant seeds and makes small burrows in soil close to or under rocks to evade owls, its main predator. The breeding season spans a few months, starting in February or March, and the litter size is typically between three and six. As with most pocket mice, the tail is longer than the body (~10 cm).

Taxonomy
Historically, rock pocket mice have been subdivided into as many as ten subspecies (Benson 1933; Dice and Blossom 1937) based on geographical distribution and coat colour. Most rock pocket mouse populations have light, tawny fur consistent with the colour of the desert rocks on which they live. However, darker coloured rock pocket mice are found living amid black, basaltic rock formations.

Example of natural selection
In 2003, scientists sampled DNA from both light- and dark-coloured rock pocket mice from areas in Pinacate Peaks, Mexico and New Mexico, USA. In the Pinacate mice, they discovered a perfect association between different versions of the Melanocortin-1 receptor (Mc41r6) gene and coat colour . Subsequent studies demonstrated that there is strong selective pressure maintaining Mc1r allele and coat colour frequencies across the short geographic distances between the light- and dark-coloured rock islands.
 
Thus melanism in rock pocket mice is considered a fabulous example of adaptation by natural selection. Changes in the Mc1r gene sequence are not responsible for the colour difference in the mice sampled from New Mexico, however, leading the researchers to conclude that the almost identical dark coat colours developed multiple times in rock pocket mice, an example of convergent evolution.

See also 

 Heteromyidae
 Perognathus
 Peppered moth evolution

References

Further reading 
, news article from the University of Arizona.
 Rock pocket mouse, profile from the Smithsonian Natural History Museum.

Chaetodipus
Mammals of the United States
Mammals of Mexico
Mammals described in 1889
Taxa named by Clinton Hart Merriam